Katherine Moore Porter (born January 3, 1974) is an American politician, law professor, and lawyer who is the U.S. representative from California's 47th congressional district since 2023, previously representing the 45th congressional district from 2019 to 2023. She is the first Democrat to be elected to represent the 45th district, covering much of south-central Orange County, including Irvine, Tustin, and Lake Forest along with large portions of Anaheim and Laguna Niguel. Porter was reelected in 2022 in the newly redistricted 47th congressional district.  

Porter graduated from Yale University and Harvard Law School and has taught law at several universities, including the University of California, Irvine, William S. Boyd School of Law, and University of Iowa. She is deputy chair of the Congressional Progressive Caucus and has received media attention for her questioning during congressional hearings. Porter declined to seek reelection to the United States House of Representatives in 2024 and became a candidate in the 2024 United States Senate election in California, to succeed retiring incumbent Dianne Feinstein.

Early life and education 
Porter was born on January 3, 1974, in Fort Dodge, Iowa. She grew up on a farm in southern Iowa. Her father, Dan Porter, was a farmer-turned-banker. Her mother, Liz, was a founder of Fons & Porter's Love of Quilting.

After graduating from Phillips Academy, Porter attended Yale University, where she majored in American studies, graduating in 1996. Her undergraduate thesis was titled The Effects of Corporate Farming on Rural Community. She was a member of Grace Hopper College (then called Calhoun College) at Yale. Porter also interned for Chuck Grassley during this time.

Porter later attended Harvard Law School, where she was the notes editor for the Harvard Women's Law Journal and a member of the Board of Student Advisers. She studied under bankruptcy law professor and future U.S. Senator Elizabeth Warren, and graduated magna cum laude with her Juris Doctor in 2001.

Career 
Porter was a law clerk for Judge Richard S. Arnold of the United States Court of Appeals for the 8th Circuit in Little Rock, Arkansas. She practiced with the law firm of Stoel Rives LLP in Portland, Oregon, and was the project director for the National Conference of Bankruptcy Judges' Business Bankruptcy Project.

Porter was an associate professor of law at the University of Nevada, Las Vegas School of Law. In 2005, she joined the faculty of the University of Iowa College of Law as an associate professor, becoming a full professor there in 2011. Also in 2011, she became a tenured professor at the University of California, Irvine School of Law. Porter's textbook Modern Consumer Law addresses consumer laws in light of Dodd–Frank and the Consumer Financial Protection Bureau.

In March 2012, California Attorney General Kamala Harris appointed Porter to be the state's independent monitor of banks in a nationwide $25 billion mortgage settlement. As monitor, she oversaw the banks' implementation of $9.5 billion in settlement reforms for Californians.

U.S. House of Representatives

Elections

2018
She defeated Walters to become the first Democrat to represent the 45th district or its predecessors since it was created in 1953. The district was the 28th from 1953 to 1963, the 35th from 1963 to 1973, the 39th from 1973 to 1975, the 40th from 1975 to 1993, the 47th from 1993 to 2003, the 48th from 2003 to 2013, and has been the 45th since 2013.

Porter and Harley Rouda, also elected in 2018, were the first non-Hispanic Democrats to represent Orange County-based districts since Jerry M. Patterson left office in 1985. Her win was part of a historic night for Democrats that saw them take every seat in the historically Republican county, including all four centered in the county.

Porter did not accept corporate PAC money in her bid for Congress. She was endorsed by End Citizens United, a political action committee seeking to overturn the U.S. Supreme Court 2010 decision Citizens United v. Federal Election Commission. Porter has cited an overhaul of campaign finance laws and protection of voting rights as legislative priorities.

2020

Porter ran for reelection to a second term. She advanced from the top-two primary in first place and faced off against the second-place finisher, Republican Mission Viejo Mayor Greg Raths, in the general election. Porter won with 53.5% of the vote to Raths's 46.5%. She became the first non-Hispanic Democrat in 38 years to win a second term in an Orange County-based district. Despite the 45th's recent trend toward the Democrats, in much of the district she is the only elected Democrat above the municipal level.

2022

Porter was reelected in California's 47th congressional district, defeating Republican nominee Scott Baugh with 51.6% of the vote to Baugh's 48.4%.

Tenure

As of June 2022, Porter had voted in line with Joe Biden's stated position 98.2% of the time.

Help America Run Act 
In March 2019, Porter introduced the "Help America Run Act" (H.R.1623), a bill that would allow people running for the House or Senate to use campaign contributions to pay for healthcare premiums, elder care, child care and dependent care. The bill passed the House in October 2019 but was not taken up by the Senate.

Congressional questioning 
Porter has gained notice for her pointed questioning of officials during congressional hearings, often using visual aids such as whiteboards.

She attracted attention for her questioning on the House Financial Services Committee. In March 2019, her questioning caught Wells Fargo CEO Tim Sloan contradicting what his corporate lawyers were arguing in court, in that statements he had previously made pledging transparency were "corporate puffery", according to documents lawyers submitted. In April 2019, Porter drew attention for her questioning of JPMorgan Chase CEO Jamie Dimon about how a Chase bank teller should make up a $567 shortfall between her monthly budget and her paycheck. In May 2019, she asked Housing and Urban Development Secretary Ben Carson about "REOs", real estate owned properties, which he confused with Oreo cookies. She asked Consumer Financial Protection Bureau director Kathy Kraninger, a Trump appointee who had extensive experience in homeland security but little in consumer finance, to solve basic math problems about annual percentage rates on payday loans, which Kraninger declined to do.

In March 2020, Porter used five minutes of questioning to get the chief of the Centers for Disease Control and Prevention, Robert R. Redfield, to agree to use its legal authority to make testing for the COVID-19 virus free for all Americans.

At an August 24, 2020, Congressional hearing, Porter questioned Postmaster General Louis DeJoy. He admitted to her that he did not know the cost of mailing a postcard or a smaller greeting card, the starting rate for U.S. Priority Mail, or how many Americans voted by mail in the 2016 elections. Before his appointment by the Trump administration, DeJoy had no previous experience working at the agency.

In a December 2020 House hearing, Porter sparred with United States Secretary of the Treasury Steve Mnuchin over COVID-19 relief funding.

In January 2021, after Porter's removal from the Financial Services Committee, The Washington Post columnist Helaine Olen criticized the House Democratic caucus for not granting Porter a waiver allowing her to serve there as well as on the House Natural Resources and House Oversight committees.

Impeachment of Donald Trump 
Porter received recognition for being one of the first Democrats in a swing district to support an impeachment inquiry based on the findings of Robert Mueller's Special Counsel investigation. She voted for both the first and second impeachments of Donald Trump.

Infrastructure bill 
Porter voted for the Infrastructure Investment and Jobs Act on November 5, 2021. The act funds electric vehicles, helps airports reduce emissions, and funds roads and bridges.

Other political roles
Porter served as one of three co-chairs of the Elizabeth Warren 2020 presidential campaign.

Committee assignments 
 Committee on Natural Resources 
Subcommittee on Oversight and Investigations (chair)
Subcommittee on Energy and Mineral Resources
Subcommittee on National Parks, Forests and Public Lands
 Committee on Oversight and Reform
Subcommittee on Economic and Consumer Policy
Subcommittee on Government Operations

Caucus memberships 
 Congressional Asian Pacific American Caucus
 Congressional Progressive Caucus

Political positions

Abortion
Porter has a 100% rating from NARAL Pro-Choice America and an F rating from Susan B. Anthony Pro-Life America for her abortion-related voting history. She opposed the overturning of Roe v. Wade, calling it "terrible...not just for women, but for all Americans."

Syria
In 2023, Porter voted against H.Con.Res. 21, which directed President Joe Biden to remove U.S. troops from Syria within 180 days.

Electoral history

2018

2020

2022

2024 United States Senate campaign 
On January 10, 2023, Porter announced her candidacy in the 2024 election for the U.S. Senate from California. The announcement came before the incumbent, Dianne Feinstein, had made her intentions concerning reelection known.  Porter raised over $1 million in donations in the 24 hours after announcing her candidacy, with an average donation of $38. Porter is supported by the Progressive Campaign Change Committee PAC and the Women Have Initiative To Elect, Boost, and Organize for A Real Democrat (WHITEBOARD) Super Pac.

Personal life 
In 2003, Porter married Matthew Hoffman, with whom she has three children. During her campaign, she said her marriage was marked by physical and mental abuse. According to Porter, Hoffman punched her, shoved her one-year-old daughter across the kitchen, threatened to kill himself, and directed profane insults at her family. She sought a protective order against him in 2013. The same year, they divorced. Porter is now a single mother with custody of their children. Her daughter, Betsy, is named after Elizabeth Warren.

See also
 Women in the United States House of Representatives

References

External links

 Congresswoman Katie Porter official U.S. House website
 Katie Porter for Congress campaign website
 

|-

|-

1974 births
California lawyers
Female members of the United States House of Representatives
Harvard Law School alumni
Iowa Democrats
Living people
Members of the United States House of Representatives from California
Women in California politics
Phillips Academy alumni
Politicians from Fort Dodge, Iowa
University of California, Irvine faculty
University of Iowa College of Law faculty
Yale College alumni
American women academics
21st-century American women
Democratic Party members of the United States House of Representatives from California
Candidates in the 2024 United States Senate elections